Vladimir Sergeyevich Kim (born 29 October 1960) is a Kazakhstani businessman and billionaire who was the richest person in Kazakhstan He made his wealth in Kazakhstan's natural resources sector. He owns a network of offshore companies.

Early life
Vladimir Kim was born in 1960. He is of Korean ethnicity. He graduated from the Kazakh Leading Academy of Architecture and Civil Engineering (then known as the Alma-Ata Architectural Institute) in 1982 with a degree in civil engineering. He holds an MBA degree, and received his PhD in business and administrative management at the John F. Kennedy University in California in 1998.

Career
In 1995, Kim was appointed managing director and chief executive officer of Zhezkazgantsvetmet JSC, Kazakhmys' core subsidiary at the time; he was elected chairman of the board of directors of Zhezkazgantsvetmet in 2000, and Chairman of Kazakhmys upon its listing on the London Stock Exchange in October 2005. Kim stepped down as chairman of Kazakhmys in May 2013 to become a non-executive director. Following the completion of the Group restructuring in 2014, Kim remained a non-executive director and a major shareholder in KAZ Minerals PLC.

KAZ Minerals PLC is a mining company quoted on the London Stock Exchange, Hong Kong Stock Exchange and Kazakhstan Stock Exchange.

He holds approximately 33% of KAZ Minerals.

Wealth and Position in the Forbes Ranking
Mining magnate Vladimir Kim claims Forbes’ number one spot for the fifth year in a row, with a fortune of $5 billion in Kazakhstan and 584 in the global rankings

Personal life
He is married, and has three children. He resides in Almaty, Kazakhstan.

References

Living people
1960 births
Koryo-saram
Kazakhstani billionaires
Kazakhstani businesspeople
Kazakhstani people of Korean descent
Kazakhmys